Ficus costata is an Asian species of fig tree in the family Moraceae.
No subspecies are listed in the Catalogue of Life its native range is SW. India, Sri Lanka, Indo-China.  The species can be found in Vietnam: where it may be called sung sóng.

References

External links

costata
Trees of Vietnam
Flora of Indo-China
Plants described in 1789